Lanistes alexandri is a species of large freshwater snail, an aquatic gastropod mollusk with a gill and an operculum in the family Ampullariidae, the apple snails.

This species is endemic to Tanzania.

References 

 UNEP-WCMC species database info

Fauna of Tanzania
Ampullariidae
Gastropods described in 1850
Taxonomy articles created by Polbot
Taxa named by Jules René Bourguignat